Frank Eugene "Hill" Harper (born May 17, 1966) is an American actor and author. He is known for his roles on CSI: NY, Limitless and The Good Doctor.

Harper is expected to his announce his candidacy to represent Michigan in the United States Senate as a Democrat in the 2024 election.

Early life and education
Harper was born in Iowa City, Iowa, the son of Harry D. Harper, II, a psychiatrist, and Marilyn Harper (née Hill), who was one of the first black practicing anesthesiologists in the United States and co-authored a book called Wearing Purple. Born Frank Eugene Harper, he adopted the name "Hill" as a tribute to both his maternal and paternal ancestors.

Harper has been acting since the age of 7. Harper graduated from Bella Vista High School in 1984.

Harper then graduated magna cum laude from Brown University in 1988, with a BA in economics and sociology and was valedictorian of his department. In 1992, he graduated with a JD, cum laude, from Harvard Law School. He received his Master of Public Administration degree from John F. Kennedy School at Harvard University. During his years at Harvard, he was a full-time member of Boston's Black Folks Theater Company, one of the oldest and most acclaimed black theater troupes in the country. 

While a student at Harvard, Harper befriended Barack Obama, with whom he played basketball. In 2012, Harper was appointed to The President's Cancer Panel, the fully vetted three-member body assigned to work with the National Institute of Health (NIH) and make recommendations to the White House around cancer policy.

He subsequently moved to Los Angeles to pursue acting. He has received eight honorary degrees, including honorary doctorates from both Westfield State College and Howard University.

Acting career
Harper's first roles in television began in 1993, in a recurring role on the Fox series Married... with Children, while also making his film debut in the short film Confessions of a Dog. He had his first acting role in a feature film with Spike Lee's Get on the Bus (1996), which cast him as a UCLA film student riding a bus to the Million Man March in Washington, D.C. He went on to further demonstrate his versatility in such films as Christopher Scott Cherot's Hav Plenty (1997) and Lee's He Got Game (1998), the former of which featured him as an egotistical pop-soul singer.

His profile subsequently rose on both the mainstream and independent film circuits, thanks to roles in films ranging from Beloved (1998) to the independent romantic comedy Loving Jezebel (1999) to The Skulls (2000). Harper did some of his most acclaimed work in Jordan Walker-Pearlman's The Visit (2000), an independent drama in which he starred as a prisoner dying of AIDS who tries to put his life back together. He also portrayed Leshem in the 2010 Syfy original movie Stonehenge Apocalypse.

Harper played coroner-turned-crime scene investigator Sheldon Hawkes on the CBS crime drama CSI: NY for nine seasons.

In February 2013, it was announced that CSI: NY would be ending and Harper would be joining the cast of Covert Affairs as a series regular.

From April 21, 2015, to May 10, 2015, Harper starred as "Hard Rock" in the Off-Broadway play ToasT. The play (produced by Lemon Andersen and co-starred Keith David) is set in the Attica Prison around the time of its 1971 prison riot and tells of the lives of its prisoners using poetic prose.

From May 1, 2018, to June 17, 2018, Harper starred as "Rooftop" in the Off-Broadway play Our Lady of 121st Street. This Dark Comedy (written by Stephen Adly Guirgis and directed by Phylicia Rashad) is about former students paying their respects to Sister Rose, only to find that Sister Rose's body has been stolen.

Since 2017, Harper has portrayed Dr. Marcus Andrews on the ABC series The Good Doctor.

Hill Harper's acting career also includes voice-over work (or voice acting) with CSI:NY the Video Game, Breathe Bible, plus, podcasts called Legal Wars and 5-Factor Authentication.

Writing career and political advocacy
Harper is the author of several books: Letters to a Young Brother: MANifest Your Destiny, published in 2006; Letters to a Young Sister: DeFINE Your Destiny, published in 2008; and The Conversation: How (Black) Men and Women Can Build Loving, Trusting Relationships, published in 2010. His books, The Wealth Cure: Putting Money in Its Place and The Wiley Boys were both published in 2011.  His book, Letters to an Incarcerated Brother: Encouragement, Hope, and Healing for Inmates and Their Loved Ones was published in 2013. Both Barack Obama and Michelle Obama contributed to the books. 

In January 2008, Harper participated in "Yes We Can", a music video produced by will.i.am supporting presidential candidate Barack Obama.  Harper is a member of the Obama for America National Finance Committee.

As of October 2009, Hill has made several contributions to political candidates, exclusively to Democrats. 
Harper endorsed the 10,000 Bookbags back-to-school backpack campaign to help local disadvantaged children with Urban Change Ministries founder Pastor Jay Cameron of the Life Center, and R&B singer Ginuwine.

On February 22, 2016, the Lawyers' Committee for Civil Rights Under Law announced that Harper would be their national spokesman.

He is also the founder of the Manifest Your Destiny Foundation, dedicated to empowering underserved youth through mentorship, scholarship, and grant programs.

He is expected to announce his run for the US Senate in Michigan, in April, to replace the retiring Debbie Stabenow.

Other endeavors

Be The Architect
After being diagnosed with thyroid cancer, Harper researched the effects skin care products can have on a person's system. This led to his creating an all-natural personal care line for men and women, called Be The Architect.

The Black Wall Street
On May 31, 2021, Hill Harper & his partners launched The Black Wall Street, a web3 digital platform and financial literacy tool aimed at addressing the racial wealth gap.

Annual Leadership Summit and Lobby Day 
In 2016, Harper was a keynote at the Annual Leadership Summit and Lobby Day.

Awards and recognition
In the fall of 2008, Harper was initiated as a member of the Alpha Phi Alpha fraternity with his Co-Initiates (called "Line Brothers") Dr. Naim Akbar of Florida State University and former NFL player Leo LeMarcus Newman.

Harper won the NAACP Image Award for Outstanding Actor in a Drama Series for three consecutive years (2008–2010) for his portrayal of Dr. Sheldon Hawkes on CSI: NY. Previously he had been nominated for the award for three consecutive years (2005–2007), for the same character. In 2000, he had also been nominated for the award, for his role in the medical drama City of Angels.  On January 9, 2014, his book Letters to an Incarcerated Brother: Encouragement, Hope, and Healing for Inmates and Their Loved Ones was nominated for an NAACP Image Award for Outstanding Literary Work – Non-Fiction.  This book, along with his three other published works, make him a 4-time New York Times Bestselling Author.

He was also a recipient of the 2011 Freedom Award, which honors individuals who have made significant contributions in civil rights and who have laid the foundation for present and future leaders in the battle for human rights. The award was conferred upon Harper from the National Civil Rights Museum in Memphis for "his nonprofit foundation, [the] Manifest Your Destiny Foundation."

In 2018, the Audience Development Committee, Inc. (AUDELCO) nominated Hill Harper for a Vivian Robinson Award; Lead Actor in a Play, for his role as Walter "Rooftop" Desmond in the Off-Broadway play:  Our Lady of 121st Street.

On Sunday, December 5, 2021, the Boston, Massachusetts' Museum of African American History honored Hill Harper with a Living Legends award - The Garrison Silver Cup.

People magazine named Hill Harper as one of the "Sexiest Men Alive" for 2004, and again for 2014.

Personal life
While writing his book The Wealth Cure: Putting Money In Its Place, Harper was diagnosed with thyroid cancer. After treatment, he was given a clean bill of health.

In November 2015, Harper received a call to adopt a baby boy. He agreed, and by May 2017, the adoption of Pierce (named after Pierce Brosnan) Hill Harper was finalized.

In 2018, Harper purchased and moved into the Charles T. Fisher Mansion in Detroit.

Filmography

Film

Television

Theatre

Published works

References

External links

Manifest Your Destiny Foundation

The Wiley Boys book
BeTheArchitect.com
The Black Wall Street

1966 births
Living people
20th-century American male actors
21st-century American male actors
21st-century American non-fiction writers
African-American male actors
Alpha Phi Alpha members
American male film actors
American male television actors
American male video game actors
Brown University alumni
California Democrats
Harvard Law School alumni
Iowa Democrats
Harvard Kennedy School alumni
Male actors from Iowa
Writers from Iowa City, Iowa
Actors from Iowa City, Iowa
20th-century African-American people
21st-century African-American writers